Tylosis may refer to:

In medicine
 Diffuse nonepidermolytic palmoplantar keratoderma, a skin condition of the palms and soles
 Howel–Evans syndrome, a skin condition of the palms and soles that is also associated with esophageal cancer

Other uses
 Tylosis (botany), a process in tree decay
 Tylosis (beetle), a genus of longhorn beetle

Palmoplantar keratodermas